Domingos Abrantes Ferreira, generally known as Domingos Abrantes (born 19 January 1936) is a Portuguese Communist politician.

He is a member of the Portuguese Communist Party since 1954, and was a member of its Central Committee between 1963 and 2012.

Domingos Abrantes was also a political prisoner during the Estado Novo dictatorship. He was arrested for the first time in 1959, and in 1961 took part in the famed escape from Caxias prison. He was again arrested in 1965, being released only in 1973.

After the Carnation Revolution he was elected member of the Assembly of the Republic for the first time in 1976, retiring from the legislature in 1995. He served as member of the Portuguese Council of State from 2016 to 2022.

References 

1936 births
Living people
Portuguese Communist Party politicians
Members of the Assembly of the Republic (Portugal)
Portuguese prisoners and detainees
Prisoners and detainees of Portugal